
The Avia BH-27 was a high-wing utility monoplane aircraft concept, designed in Czechoslovakia in the late 1920s. It would have seated three passengers within an enclosed cabin, and would have been powered by an 82 kW (110 hp) Walter engine. Development was cancelled, however, before any prototype was built.

Specifications

References

 

1920s Czechoslovakian civil utility aircraft
BH-27